Frank Leslie Thomson Wilmot (6 April 1881 – 22 February 1942), who published his work under the pseudonym Furnley Maurice, was a noted Australian poet, best known for To God: From the Warring Nations (1917).

Early life
Wilmot was a son of Henry William Wilmot, an ironmonger and pioneer of the socialist movement in Victoria, and his wife, Elizabeth Mary Hind. He was born at Collingwood, a suburb of Melbourne, and was educated at the North Fitzroy State School. In 1895 he obtained employment at Cole's Book Arcade, Melbourne. He married Ida Meeking in 1910, and they had two sons. Wilmot gradually improved his position at the book arcade and, when the business was wound up by the executors of the Cole estate in 1929, held the position of manager.

Career
Wilmot began contributing verse to The Tocsin, a Melbourne Labour paper, before he was 20 and also produced his own monthly magazine called Microbe.

His first separate publication, Some Verses by Frank Wilmot, appeared in 1903, and attracted little notice. Another little volume, Some More Verses, was printed in 1904 but was suppressed before publication. Some years later a few copies of this volume were discovered which found their way into collectors' hands. Finding at one stage that his work was being persistently rejected, especially by Bulletin where the editor Alfred George Stephens was known to dislike Wilmot, Wilmot adopted the pseudonym of "Furnley Maurice", and his poems thereafter were published either anonymously or under this pseudonym.

In 1913 a slim, well-printed volume, Unconditioned Songs, published anonymously, attracted some attention. His next publication, To God: from the Weary Nations, which came out in 1917, criticised conscription. Revised and with a slightly altered title "To God: from the Warring Nations" the poem was later reprinted in Eyes of Vigilance, but in the meantime an entirely different piece of work, The Bay and Padie Book: Kiddie Songs, had come out (first ed. 1917, third ed. 1926). This volume was meant especially for young children, and few writers in this medium have been so successful. In Eyes of Vigilance, which appeared in 1920, Wilmot printed some of his best work, and in Arrows of Longing, published in 1921, he gathered together most of his uncollected work up to that date. In 1925 The Gully, a poem of about 200 lines, was published in a limited edition.

In 1929 Wilmot had to find fresh means of making a living. He had of course made very little from his poetry. On leaving Cole's Book Arcade he bought its circulating library and carried it on for about three years, also doing some bookselling. It did not pay well and early in 1932 he applied for the position of manager of the Melbourne University Press and was appointed. He carried on the press with great success until the time of his death. It was not only that he expanded its activities very much, he made it pay. And though much of the work published was naturally educational, the press during his period published other important books and incidentally set a high standard in technical production. Though working very hard during the period after leaving Cole's, Wilmot still found time to do original work. The Gully and Other Verses, published in 1929, was the most even in quality of his volumes, and Melbourne Odes which appeared in 1934 contained the centenary ode for which he was awarded a prize of £50 in 1934.

Late life
Wilmot had a serious operation in 1934 for appendicitis, which apparently was not completely successful, as another operation was necessary about a year later. On his recovery he continued working hard, always hoping that he might have a few years of leisure in which to do original work. In 1940 he was chosen to deliver the first course of lectures on Australian literature at the University of Melbourne. He died suddenly at Melbourne on 22 February 1942, aged 60. In addition to the works mentioned Wilmot published in 1922, Romance, a collection of essays in prose, which though somewhat slight are excellently written. He wrote the verses and some of the prose in Here is Faery, published in 1915, and a few single poems were issued separately. These will be found listed in Miller's Australian Literature. Among them was an essay in satire, Odes for a Curse-Speaking Choir I. Ottawar! An Ode to Humbug. He also wrote short stories and some plays, two or three of which were staged by amateurs. He collaborated with Percival Serle and R. H. Croll in the production of An Australasian Anthology, and with Professor Cowling in Australian Essays. In 1940 appeared Path to Parnassus Anthology for Schools, a charming selection of English and Australian poems with an illuminating introduction. A selection from his poetry was published in 1944.

References

Geoffrey Serle, Wilmot, Frank Leslie Thompson (1881–1942), Australian Dictionary of Biography, Volume 12, MUP, 1990, pp 515–516.

Additional sources listed by the Dictionary of Australian Biography:
Vance Palmer, Frank Wilmot; B. M. Ramsden, The Australian Quarterly, June 1943, p. 108; E. Morris Miller, Australian Literature; Elzevir, The Argus, Melbourne, 2 February 1935

Additional sources listed by the Australian Dictionary of Biography:
V. Palmer, Frank Wilmot (Furnley Maurice) (Melbourne, 1942); H. Anderson, Frank Wilmot (Furnley Maurice): A Bibliography and a Criticism (Melb., 1955); F. T. Macartney, Furnley Maurice (Sydney, 1955); D. R. Walker, Dream and Disillusion (Canberra, 1976); Australian Quarterly, 15, June 1943, p 108; Meanjin Quarterly, 33, no 1 (1974), 41, no 4 (1982); F. L. T. Wilmot papers (State Library of New South Wales).

External links
 
 
 
The Bay and Padie book : kiddie songs
Photograph of Furnley Maurice (1881–1942) at Picture Australia

1881 births
1942 deaths
20th-century Australian poets
Australian male poets
20th-century Australian male writers